Mosås is a village situated in Örebro Municipality, Örebro County, Sweden with 899 inhabitants in 2005.

References 

Örebro
Populated places in Örebro Municipality